The Dhan Academy is an institution in India for Post Graduation in development management. Located in Madurai, it was co-founded by the Sir Ratan Tata Trust and the DHAN Foundation in December 2000. The Dhan Academy trains students to be development professionals.

The Academy’s focus is on its two-year Programme in Post Graduate Diploma in development management, during which students learn to become development professionals and development entrepreneurs.  PDM is a two-years fully funded (free) residential programme where students learn appropriate managerial techniques to deal with complex issues of development. This helps in effective development programmes at various levels. After their two years course, they will be placed in NGOs and work with the community for three years.  Only then they will be awarded with the certificate and Diploma.

Centres

Asian Knowledge Centre for Mutual Insurance (ASKMI) 
The Asian Knowledge Centre for Mutual Insurance is a specialized centre at the Tata-Dhan Academy.

Advanced Centre for Enabling Disaster Risk Reduction (ACEDRR) 
The Advanced Centre for Enabling Disaster Risk Reduction (ACEDRR) is a specialised centre established at the Tata-Dhan Academy by DHAN Foundation with the support of Oxfam America, an international relief and development organization and affiliate of Oxfam International that works on creating lasting solutions to poverty, hunger, and injustice. The ACEDRR aims at enhancing the knowledge and practices on disaster risk reduction (DRR) by working with peoples' organisations, non-government and government organizations, technical institutes, research and academic institutes and funding agencies

Advanced Centre for Enabling Women Empowerment (ACEWE) 
Advanced Centre for Enabling Women Empowerment (ACEWE) is a specialized centre being established by DHAN Foundation.

Water Knowledge Centre (WKC) 
Water Knowledge Centre (WKC) aims at enhancing the knowledge and practice on integrated water resource management by working with peoples’ institutions, government and non-government organizations, technical institutes, research and academic institutes and funding agencies.

DHAN Centre for Social Enterprise  
DHAN Centre for Social Enterprise is the livelihood advancement initiative of DHAN Foundation and TDA. The centre has been initiated recently for evolving the model for livelihood graduation of small and marginal producers involved in both farm and nonfarm activities for increasing their income. The CSE has promoted incubation centre and school for sustainable production. The incubation centre focuses on promoting and sustaining the producer organizations. At present the CSE, handholds 52 farmers' producer organizations which are promoted with the support of SFAC and NABARD across six states of the country. To have a common identity the FPOs and their products are branded as Jeevidam.

References

 Education in Madurai
Educational institutions established in 2000
2000 establishments in Tamil Nadu